Storia de fratelli e de cortelli (A story of brothers and knives) is a 1973 Italian comedy-drama film written and directed by Mario Amendola.

Plot 

Gigi and Nino Romagnoli are two brothers living in Rome at the beginning of the  20th century. Gigi, young and handsome, engaged to Rosetta, falls in love with Mara, a young woman who is accustomed to luxury and refinement. In order to satisfy the woman’s desire, Gigi start stealing and going into all serious.

Cast 

 Maurizio Arena: Nino Romagnoli
 Guido Mannari: Gigi Romagnoli
 Tina Aumont: Mara
 Ninetto Davoli: Riccetto 
 Franco Citti:  Artemio 
 Anna Maria Pescatori: Armida Romagnoli
 Vittorio De Sica: Marshal Cenciarelli
 Sandra Cardini: Tecla
 Elena Veronese: Rosetta
 Toni Ucci:   Silvio

References

External links

1973 films
Italian comedy-drama films
1973 comedy-drama films
Films directed by Mario Amendola
Films scored by Franco Micalizzi
1970s Italian-language films
1970s Italian films